Lyall Watson (12 April 1939 – 25 June 2008) was a South African botanist, zoologist, biologist, anthropologist, ethologist, and author of many books, among the most popular of which is the best seller Supernature. Lyall Watson tried to make sense of natural and supernatural phenomena in biological terms. He is credited with coining the "hundredth monkey" effect in his 1979 book, Lifetide; later, in The Whole Earth Review, he conceded this was "a metaphor of my own making".

Life
Malcolm Lyall-Watson was born in Johannesburg.  He had an early fascination for nature in the surrounding bush, learning from Zulu and !Kung bushmen. Watson attended boarding school at Rondebosch Boys' High School in Cape Town, completing his studies in 1955.  He enrolled at the University of the Witwatersrand in 1956, at the age of 15 where, by the time he was 19, he had earned degrees in both botany and zoology, before securing an apprenticeship in palaeontology under Raymond Dart, leading on to anthropological studies in Germany and the Netherlands. Later he earned degrees in geology, chemistry, marine biology, ecology, and anthropology.  He completed a doctorate in ethology at the University of London, under Desmond Morris.  He also worked at the BBC writing and producing nature documentaries.

Around this time he shortened his name to Lyall Watson.  He served as director of the Johannesburg Zoo from the age of 23, an expedition leader to various locales, and Seychelles commissioner for the International Whaling Commission.

In the late 1980s and early 1990s Watson presented Channel 4's coverage of sumo tournaments.

Watson married Vivienne Mawson in 1961, and they divorced in 1966. His second wife was Jacquey Visick, and his third wife, Alice Coogan, died in 2003.  He was the eldest of three brothers, one of whom (Andrew) lived in Gympie, Queensland, Australia.  It was while visiting Andrew that he died of a stroke on 25 June 2008. He lived in Cork, Ireland.

Writing career 
Watson began writing his first book, Omnivore during the early 1960s while under the supervision of Desmond Morris, and wrote more than 21 others.

Bibliography 

Omnivore: The Role of Food in Human Evolution (1972)
Supernature: A Natural History of the Supernatural (1973)
The Romeo Error (1974) (Later reprinted as The Biology of Death)
Gifts of Unknown Things: An Indonesian Adventure (1976)
Lifetide: a Biology of the Unconscious (1979)
Whales of the World: A Field Guide to the Cetaceans (1981)
Lightning Bird: An African Adventure (1982)
Heaven's Breath: A Natural History of the Wind (1984)
Bali Entranced: A Celebration of Ritual (1985) - published in Japanese only
Earthworks: Ideas on the Edge of Natural History (1986) (Later reprinted as Dreams of Dragons)
Beyond Supernature: A New Natural History of the Supernatural (1986) (Later reprinted as Supernature 2)
The Water Planet: A Celebration of the Wonder of Water (1988)
Neophilia: The Tradition of the New (1989)
Sumo: A Guide to Sumo Wrestling (1989)
The Nature of Things: The Secret Life of Inanimate Objects (1990)
Gifts of Unknown Things: A True Story of Nature, Healing and Initiation from Indonesia's ''Dancing Island'' (1992)
Lasting Nostalgia: Essays Out of Africa (1992) - published in Japanese only
Turtle Islands: Ritual in Indonesia (1995)
Dark Nature:  A Natural History of Evil (1995)
Dreams of Dragons: An Exploration and Celebration of the Mysteries of Nature (1996)
Monsoon: Essays on the Indian Ocean (1996) - published in Japanese only
Lost Cradle: A Collection of Dialogues (1997) - published in Japanese only
Warriors, Warthogs, and Wisdom: Growing up in Africa (1997)
Jacobson's Organ and the Remarkable Nature of Smell (2000)
Elephantoms: Tracking the Elephant (2002)
The Whole Hog: Exploring the Extraordinary Potential of Pigs (2004)

References

 WATSON, Lyall International Who's Who. accessed 3 September 2006.

1939 births
2008 deaths
20th-century South African botanists
South African anthropologists
Ethologists
Alumni of the University of London
Alumni of Rondebosch Boys' High School
Scientists from Johannesburg
Consciousness researchers and theorists
Parapsychologists
South African science writers
20th-century anthropologists
20th-century South African zoologists